The FIS Nordic World Ski Championships 1997 took place from February 21 to March 2 at Granåsen Ski Centre in Trondheim, Norway. This event was the first time in consecutive championships that the number or type of events did not change since 1966 and 1970. It also was historical with Russia's Yelena Välbe winning gold in all five women's cross country events, the first person of either sex to do that honor. Norway's Bjørn Dæhlie became the first man to win five medals in five cross country events.

Men's cross country

10 km classical 
February 24, 1997

10 km + 15 km combined pursuit 
February 25, 1997

30 km freestyle 
February 21, 1997

50 km classical 
March 2, 1997

4 × 10 km relay
February 28, 1997

Women's cross country

5 km classical 
February 23, 1997

Lyubov Yegorova of Russia finished first in this event, but was disqualified three days later for doping violation of bromotan. The three finishers behind her were subsequently awarded the medals shown.

5 km + 10 km combined pursuit 
February 24, 1997

The winner had to be determined by photo finish. The gold medal was won by Välbe by a 2 cm difference.

 both athletes were still credited with the same time.

15 km freestyle
February 21, 1997

30 km classical 
March 1, 1997

4 × 5 km relay
February 28, 1997

Men's Nordic combined

15 km Individual Gundersen
February 22, 1997

4 × 5 km team
February 23, 1997

Men's ski jumping

Individual normal hill 
February 22, 1997

Individual large hill 
March 1, 1997

Team large hill
February 27, 1997

Medal table

Medal winners by nation.

References

External links
 FIS 1997 Cross country results
 FIS 1997 Nordic combined results
 FIS 1997 Ski jumping results

FIS Nordic World Ski Championships
Nordic Skiing
1997 in ski jumping
Sports competitions in Trondheim
1997 in Norwegian sport
Ski jumping competitions in Norway
1997 in Nordic combined
February 1997 sports events in Europe
March 1997 sports events in Europe
Nordic skiing competitions in Norway
20th century in Trondheim